Uri Zvi Greenberg (September 22, 1896 – May 8, 1981; also spelled Uri Zvi Grinberg) was an acclaimed Israeli poet,  journalist and politician who wrote in Yiddish and Hebrew. Widely regarded among the greatest poets in the country's history, he was awarded the Israel Prize in 1957 and the Bialik Prize in 1947, 1954 and 1977, all for his contributions to fine literature. Following Israeli independence in 1948, he also served in the first Knesset as a member of Menachem Begin's Herut Party. Greenberg's Revisionist orientation had an important influence on both his writings and his politics. Greenberg is considered to be the most significant representative of Expressionism in Hebrew and Yiddish literature.

Biography
Uri Zvi Greenberg was born in the Galician town Bilyi Kamin, in Austria-Hungary, into a prominent Hasidic family. He was raised in Lemberg (Lwów) where he received a traditional Jewish religious education.

In 1915, he was drafted into the Austrian army and fought in the First World War. His experience at the fording of the Save River, where many of his comrades in arms died or were severely wounded, affected him deeply, and appeared in his future writings for years to come. After returning to Lemberg, he was witness to the pogroms of November 1918. Greenberg and his family miraculously escaped being shot by Polish soldiers celebrating their victory over the Ukrainians, an experience which convinced him that all Jews living in the “Kingdom of the Cross” faced physical annihilation.

Greenberg moved to Warsaw in 1920, where he wrote for the radical literary publications of young Jewish poets. After a brief stay in Berlin, he immigrated to Mandatory Palestine (the Land of Israel) in 1923.

Greenberg spent most of the 1930s in Poland, working as a Revisionist-Zionist activist until the time when the Second World War erupted in 1939. At the outset of the war, Greenberg was able to escape and moved to Mandatory Palestine. His parents and sisters remained behind and were subsequently murdered during the Holocaust.

In 1950, Greenberg married Aliza, with whom he had three daughters and two sons. He added  "Tur-Malka" to the family name, but continued to use "Greenberg" to honor family members who were murdered in the Holocaust. Greenberg was a resident of Ramat Gan.

Literary career

Young Greenberg was encouraged to write by Shmuel Yankev Imber, a Yiddish neo-romantic poet, and Tsevi Bikeles-Shpitser, the Yiddish theater critic who edited the local Tagblat. Some of his poems in Yiddish and Hebrew were published when he was 16. His first works were published in 1912 in the Labor Zionist weekly Der yudisher arbayter (The Jewish Laborer) in Lemberg and in Hebrew in Ha-Shiloaḥ (The Shiloach) in Odessa. His first book, in Yiddish, was published in Lwów while he was fighting on the Serbian front. In 1920, Greenberg moved to Warsaw, with its lively Jewish cultural scene. He was one of the founders of Di Chaliastre (literally, "the gang"), a group of young Yiddish writers that included Melech Ravitch. He also edited a Yiddish literary journal, Albatros. In the wake of his iconoclastic depictions of Jesus in the second issue of Albatros, particularly his prose poem Royte epl fun veybeymer (Red Apples from the Trees of Pain), the journal was banned by the Polish censors and Greenberg fled to Berlin to escape prosecution in November 1922. The magazine incorporated avant-garde elements both in content and typography, taking its cue from German periodicals like Die Aktion  and Der Sturm. Greenberg published the last two issues of Albatros in Berlin before renouncing European society and immigrating to Palestine in December 1923.

In his early days in Palestine, Greenberg wrote for Davar, one of the main newspapers of the Labour Zionist movement. In his poems and articles he warned of the fate in store for the Jews of the Diaspora. After the Holocaust, he mourned the fact that his terrible prophecies had come true. His works represent a synthesis of traditional Jewish values and an individualistic lyrical approach to life and its problems. They draw on Jewish sources such as the Bible, the Talmud and the prayer book, but are also influenced by European literature.

Literary motifs
In the second and third issues of Albatros, Greenberg invokes pain as a key marker of the modern era. This theme is illustrated in  Royte epl fun vey beymer and Veytikn-heym af slavisher erd (Pain-Home on Slavic Ground).

Political activism
In 1930, Greenberg joined the Revisionist camp, representing the Revisionist movement at several Zionist congresses and in Poland. After the 1929 Hebron massacre, he became more militant. With Abba Ahimeir and Yehoshua Yeivin, he founded Brit HaBirionim, a clandestine, self-declared fascist faction of the Revisionist movement which adopted an activist policy of violating British mandatory regulations. In the early 1930s, the members of Brit Habirionim group disrupted a British-sponsored census, sounded the shofar in prayer at the Western Wall despite a British prohibition, held a protest rally when a British colonial official visited Tel Aviv, and tore down Nazi flags from German offices in Jerusalem and Tel Aviv. When the British arrested hundreds of its members the organization effectively ceased to exist.

He believed that the Holocaust was a 'tragic but almost inevitable outcome of Jewish indifference to their destiny.' As early as 1923, Greenberg "envisioned and warned of the destruction of European Jewry."

Following Israeli independence in 1948, he joined Menachem Begin's Herut movement. In 1949, he was elected to the first Knesset. He lost his seat in the 1951 elections. After the Six-Day War he joined the Movement for Greater Israel, which advocated Israeli sovereignty over the West Bank.

Awards and recognition
 In 1947, 1954 and 1977, Greenberg was awarded the Bialik Prize for literature.
 In 1957, Greenberg was awarded the Israel Prize for his contribution to literature.
 In 1976, the Knesset held a special session in honor of his eightieth birthday.

Published works (in Hebrew)
A Great Fear and the Moon (poetry), Hedim, 1925 (Eymah Gedolah Ve-Yareah)
Manhood on the Rise (poetry), Sadan, 1926 (Ha-Gavrut Ha-Olah)
A Vision of One of the Legions (poetry), Sadan, 1928 (Hazon Ehad Ha-Legionot)
Anacreon at the Pole of Sorrow (poetry), Davar, 1928 (Anacreon Al Kotev Ha-Itzavon)
House Dog (poetry), Hedim, 1929 (Kelev Bayit)
A Zone of Defense and Address of the Son-of-Blood (poetry), Sadan, 1929 (Ezor Magen Ve-Ne`um Ben Ha-Dam)
The Book of Indictment and Faith (poetry), Sadan, 1937 (Sefer Ha-Kitrug Ve-Ha-Emunah)
From the Ruddy and the Blue (poetry), Schocken, 1950 (Min Ha-Kahlil U-Min Ha-Kahol)
Streets of the River (poetry), Schocken, 1951 (Rehovot Ha-Nahar)
In the Middle of the World, In the Middle of Time (poetry), Hakibbutz Hameuchad, 1979 (Be-Emtza Ha-Olam, Be-Emtza Ha-Zmanim)
Selected Poems (poetry), Schocken, 1979 (Mivhar Shirim)
Complete Works of Uri Zvi Greenberg, Bialik Institute, 1991 (Col Kitvei)
At the Hub, Bialik Institute, 2007 (Ba-'avi ha-shir)

See also
The Modern Hebrew Poem Itself
List of Hebrew-language poets
List of Israel Prize recipients
Literature of Israel

References

Further reading

Avidov Lipsker, Red Poem\ Blue Poem: Seven Essays on Uri Zvi Grinberg and Two Essays on Else Lasker-Schüler, Bar Ilan University Press, Ramat-Gan 2010.
Gilles Rozier, D'un pays sans amour, a novel about the life of UZG and his friendship with Peretz Markish and Melekh Ravitch, Grasset, Paris, 2011.

External links

Collected poems and essays of Uri Zvi Greenberg
Under the Tooth of their Plow, Uri Zvi Grinberg

Tamar Wolf-Monzon, Uri Zvi Greenberg and the Pioneers of the Third Aliyah: A Case of Reception
Uri Zvi Before the Cross: The Figure of Jesus in the Poetry of Uri Zvi Greenberg, Religion & Literature, Winter 2009, Neta Stahl
Walt Whitman and Uri Zvi Greenberg: Voice and Dialogue, Apostrophe and Discourse, Chanita Goodblatt
Poetry and Prophecy: The image of the poet as a "prophet," a hero and an artist in modern Hebrew poetry

1896 births
1981 deaths
People from Lviv Oblast
Ukrainian Orthodox Jews
Polish emigrants to Mandatory Palestine
Herut politicians
Movement for Greater Israel politicians
Israeli male poets
Israeli newspaper editors
Israel Prize in literature recipients
Israeli Orthodox Jews
Ashkenazi Jews in Mandatory Palestine
Jewish fascists
Lehi (militant group)
Burials at the Jewish cemetery on the Mount of Olives
Hebrew-language poets
Members of the 1st Knesset (1949–1951)
20th-century Israeli poets
20th-century male writers
Far-right politics in Israel
Revisionist Zionism
Recipients of Prime Minister's Prize for Hebrew Literary Works